La usurpadora may refer to:

La usurpadora (Venezuelan TV series), a 1971 Salvadorian telenovela starring Marina Baura and Raúl Amundaray.
La usurpadora (1998 TV series), a 1998 Mexican telenovela starring Gaby Spanic and Fernando Colunga.
La usurpadora (2019 TV series), a 2019 Mexican telenovela starring Sandra Martillo and Arap Bethke.

See also

 El hogar que yo robé, a 1981 Mexican remake of the series
 La intrusa (1986 TV series), a 1986 Venezuelan remake of the 1971 series
 ¿Quién eres tú?, a 2012 Mexican remake of the series